Bazeilles-sur-Othain (literally Bazeilles on Othain) is a commune in the Meuse department in the Grand Est region in northeastern France.

Geography
The river Othain flows west through the southern part of the commune and crosses the village. The Chiers forms all of the commune's northern border.

Population

See also
Communes of the Meuse department

References

Communes of Meuse (department)